Profondo Rosso (Deep Red) is a horror film memorabilia store and museum located in Rome, Italy.  The store is owned by film director Dario Argento and named after his film Deep Red.

The basement of the store houses a museum of props from Dario Argento's films.

References

External links

Year of establishment missing
Shops in Rome
Museums in Rome
Dario Argento